Temple of Agriculture or Altar of Agriculture is a historic site in Xuanwu District of Beijing, China, and located near the Temple of Heaven.

History 
The Temple of Agriculture was built in the 15th century. It was used by Ming and Qing emperors to perform sacrifices to Xiannong (先农), the mythical Emperor Yandi (c. 2900 BC-2800 BC), who is said to have invented the plow, discovered the medicinal uses of plants, and created the first marketplaces.

The temple's Jufu Hall was included in the 1998 World Monuments Watch by the World Monuments Fund (WMF) when it was in danger of collapse, and again in 2000 along with the rest of the temple. In 1998, American Express provided funding through WMF for the restoration of the structure. Other structures on the site were subsequently restored, and the work included stabilization, wood treatment, repair and conservation of the tiles, and consolidation and preservation of the painted decoration. Today, the site has the status of Major Site Protected at the National Level of China.

In artwork

References

External links
Erling Ho, ICON Magazine, "Rites of Spring: Beijing’s Xiannontang, an imperial altar complex honoring the gods of agriculture, gets a long-overdue facelift," Spring 2004, p. 28-33.
Altar of Agriculture (Xiannong tan)

Religious buildings and structures in Beijing
Tourist attractions in Beijing
Major National Historical and Cultural Sites in Beijing